In enzymology, a glycoprotein 2-beta-D-xylosyltransferase is an enzyme that catalyzes the chemical reaction

UDP-D-xylose + N4-{N-acetyl-beta-D-glucosaminyl-(1->2)-alpha-D-mannosyl-(1->3)-[N- acetyl-beta-D-glucosaminyl-(1->2)-alpha-D-mannosyl-(1->6)]-beta-D- mannosyl-(1->4)-N-acetyl-beta-D-glucosaminyl-(1->4)-N-acetyl-beta-D- glucosaminyl}asparagine  UDP + N4-{N-acetyl-beta-D-glucosaminyl-(1->2)-alpha-D-mannosyl-(1->3)-[N- acetyl-beta-D-glucosaminyl-(1->2)-alpha-D-mannosyl-(1->6)]-[beta-D- xylosyl-(1->2)]-beta-D-mannosyl-(1->4)-N-acetyl-beta-D-glucosaminyl- (1->4)-N-acetyl-beta-D-glucosaminyl}asparagine

The 5 substrates of this enzyme are UDP-D-xylose, [[N4-{N-acetyl-beta-D-glucosaminyl-(1->2)-alpha-D-mannosyl-(1->3)-[N-]], [[acetyl-beta-D-glucosaminyl-(1->2)-alpha-D-mannosyl-(1->6)]-beta-D-]], [[mannosyl-(1->4)-N-acetyl-beta-D-glucosaminyl-(1->4)-N-acetyl-beta-D-]], and [[glucosaminyl}asparagine]], whereas its 5 products are UDP, [[N4-{N-acetyl-beta-D-glucosaminyl-(1->2)-alpha-D-mannosyl-(1->3)-[N-]], [[acetyl-beta-D-glucosaminyl-(1->2)-alpha-D-mannosyl-(1->6)]]-beta-D-, [[xylosyl-(1->2)]-beta-D-mannosyl-(1->4)-N-acetyl-beta-D-glucosaminyl-]], and [[(1->4)-N-acetyl-beta-D-glucosaminyl}asparagine]].

This enzyme belongs to the family of glycosyltransferases, specifically the pentosyltransferases.  The systematic name of this enzyme class is UDP-D-xylose:glycoprotein (D-xylose to the 3,6-disubstituted mannose of N4-{N-acetyl-beta-D-glucosaminyl-(1->2)-alpha-D-mannosyl-(1->3)-[N-a cetyl-beta-D-glucosaminyl-(1->2)-alpha-D-mannosyl-(1->6)]-beta-D-man nosyl-(1->4)-N-acetyl-beta-D-glucosaminyl-(1->4)-N-acetyl-beta-D-glu cosaminyl}asparagine) 2-beta-D-xylosyltransferase. Other names in common use include beta1,2-xylosyltransferase, UDP-D-xylose:glycoprotein (D-xylose to the 3,6-disubstituted mannose, of, 4-N-{N-acetyl-beta-D-glucosaminyl-(1->2)-alpha-D-mannosyl-(1->3)-[N-, acetyl-beta-D-glucosaminyl-(1->2)-alpha-D-mannosyl-(1->6)]-beta-D-, mannosyl-(1->4)-N-acetyl-beta-D-glucosaminyl-(1->4)-N-acetyl-beta-D-, and glucosaminyl}asparagine) 2-beta-D-xylosyltransferase.  This enzyme participates in glycan structures - biosynthesis 1.

References

 
 

EC 2.4.2
Enzymes of unknown structure